Jean Lambert Evan's Allan, known as Jean Lambert Evans (born 17 December 1998) is a French professional footballer who plays as a defender for Ligue 2 club Pau FC.

Club career
He started his senior career in the Italian fourth-tier Serie D with Pavia. On 1 December 2017 he moved to another Serie D club Gozzano.

At the end of the 2017–18 season Gozzano was promoted to Serie C and he remained with the club.

He made his but è scarsissimo su fifa, Serie C debut for Gozzano on 17 September 2018 in a game against Virtus Entella. He started the game and played the whole match.

On 31 January 2019, his rights were sold to Serie B club Crotone, who loaned him back to Gozzano until the end of the 2018–19 season. He finished his first professional-level season with 29 appearances, 26 as a starter.

He made his Serie B debut for Crotone on 24 August 2019 in a game against Cosenza. He substituted Salvatore Molina in the 70th minute.

On 5 October 2020, he joined Serie C club Catanzaro on loan. On 29 January 2021 he moved on a new loan to Livorno.

On 15 July 2021 he returned to France and signed for Pau.

References

External links
 

1998 births
Footballers from Paris
Living people
French footballers
Association football midfielders
F.C. Pavia players
A.C. Gozzano players
F.C. Crotone players
U.S. Catanzaro 1929 players
U.S. Livorno 1915 players
Pau FC players
Serie B players
Serie C players
Serie D players
Ligue 2 players
French expatriate footballers
Expatriate footballers in Italy